Vice Admiral Daya Shankar PVSM, DSC (2 January 1912 – 18 November 1993) was a decorated Indian Navy admiral, naval engineer and the first Indian Armed Forces officer to hold the appointment of Controller General Defence Production.

Early career
Among the first Indians to be selected for the Royal Indian Marine in 1930, Shankar was appointed an engineer sub-lieutenant (on probation) in the Royal Indian Navy on 23 April 1935, and was confirmed in his appointment on 23 October 1936. He was promoted to engineer lieutenant on 23 April 1938. On 2 August 1939, Shankar was assigned to HMIS Dalhousie, the RIN depot ship and training barracks based at Bombay, as well as to the P-class sloop HMIS Pathan.

During the Second World War, Shankar was assigned to the sloop HMIS Lawrence on 21 November 1940; among the other junior officers then assigned to her was the future admiral and Indian Navy Chief of the Naval Staff Sourendra Nath Kohli. For "courage, enterprise and devotion to duty in operations in the Persian Gulf," Shankar was awarded the Distinguished Service Cross (DSC) on 10 March 1942, one of only a few Indian officers to be so decorated during the war. On 3 December, he was assigned to the sloop HMIS Hindustan, and was promoted acting engineer lieutenant-commander on 30 September 1943. He was promoted substantive engineer lieutenant-commander on 23 April 1946.

Post-independence
Following Indian independence in 1947, Shankar served at Naval Headquarters and was promoted engineer commander (acting engineer captain) on 31 December 1948. In 1950, he became the second Indian officer to command INS Shivaji, the mechanical training establishment of the Indian Navy, with promotion to substantive engineer captain on 30 June 1951. He was subsequently appointed the Industrial Manager, Indian Naval Dockyard Bombay, and in July 1954 became the first Indian officer to be appointed Chief of Material at Naval HQ. On 24 September 1956, the post of Chief of Material was upgraded to the status of a commodore (2nd class), making Shankar the first Indian naval engineer officer to be elevated to this rank. He was promoted to engineer rear-admiral on 28 December 1959, becoming the first naval engineering officer to attain flag rank, and was appointed Controller-General Ordnance Factories. In 1960, he was further appointed Controller-General Defence Production, and held the appointment until his retirement on 20 August 1964.

Later life
Retiring in Delhi, Shankar was conferred the honorary rank of vice-admiral on 20 December 1985. He died at Delhi in the morning of 18 November 1993, and was cremated with full military honours the following afternoon. He was survived by his daughter and two sons, one an air commodore in the Indian Air Force.

References

1912 births
1993 deaths
Indian Navy admirals
Indian sailors
Indian military personnel of World War II
Royal Indian Navy officers
Recipients of the Param Vishisht Seva Medal
Recipients of the Distinguished Service Cross (United Kingdom)
Chiefs of Materiel (India)
Indian recipients of the Distinguished Service Cross (United Kingdom)